Stina Hedberg (born Amanda Kristina Sofia Ulrika Holm; 21 August 1887 – 20 November 1981) was a Swedish stage and film actress. She also appeared in eight films between 1936 and 1946. She was married to the writer Tor Hedberg from 1911 until his death in 1931.

Selected filmography
 The Girls of Uppakra (1936)
 Sigge Nilsson och jag (1938)
 Children of Divorce (1939)
 Lucky Young Lady (1941)
 Turn of the Century (1944)
 Brita in the Merchant's House (1946)
 Incorrigible (1946)

References

Bibliography
 Paietta, Ann C. Teachers in the Movies: A Filmography of Depictions of Grade School, Preschool and Day Care Educators, 1890s to the Present. McFarland, 2007.
Waal, Carla. Harriet Bosse: Strindberg's Muse and Interpreter. Southern Illinois University Press, 1990.

External links

1887 births
1981 deaths
Swedish film actresses
Swedish stage actresses
Actresses from Stockholm
20th-century Swedish actresses